Lehigh University Press is the publishing house of Lehigh University. Lehigh's university press was a member of the Associated University Presses consortium; other members included Bucknell University Press, University of Delaware Press, Susquehanna University Press and Fairleigh Dickinson University Press. When Associated University Presses ceased most new publishing in 2010, a new distribution agreement between Lehigh University Press, Bucknell University Press, University of Delaware Press, and Fairleigh Dickinson University Press was struck with Rowman & Littlefield.

Founded in 1985, the current director of the press is Lehigh English professor Kate Crassons. The press's three main areas of focus are 18th-century studies, local history, and science and technology in society.

See also

 List of English-language book publishing companies
 List of university presses

References

External links

Lehigh University
University presses of the United States
Publishing companies established in 1985
Book publishing companies based in Pennsylvania
American companies established in 1985